The 1931–32 season was the first season of competitive association football in the Football League played by Chester, an English club based in Chester, Cheshire.

Chester was elected to the Football League in the second round of voting surpassing Nelson after the first voting ended in a draw.

Football League

Results summary

Results by matchday

Matches

† - Wigan Borough later resigned from the league, record expunged

FA Cup

Welsh Cup

Season statistics

References

Further reading

External links 

1931-32
English football clubs 1931–32 season